The province of Yogyakarta Special Region in Indonesia is divided into 1 city and 4 regencies which in turn are divided administratively into kapanewon or kemantren (districts). A Kapanewon (a subdivision of a regency) is headed by a panewu, while a kemantren (a subdivision of the city), is headed by a mantri pamong praja.

The districts of Yogyakarta Special Region with the regency it falls into are as follows:

 Bambanglipuro, Bantul
 Banguntapan, Bantul
 Bantul, Bantul
 Berbah, Sleman
 Cangkringan, Sleman
 Danurejan, Yogyakarta
 Depok, Sleman
 Dlingo, Bantul
 Galur, Kulon Progo
 Gamping, Sleman
 Gedangsari, Gunung Kidul
 Gedongtengen, Yogyakarta
 Girimulyo, Kulon Progo
 Girisubo, Gunung Kidul
 Godean, Sleman
 Gondokusuman, Yogyakarta
 Gondomanan, Yogyakarta
 Imogiri, Bantul
 Jetis, Bantul
 Jetis, Yogyakarta
 Kalasan, Sleman
 Kalibawang, Kulon Progo
 Karangmojo, Gunung Kidul
 Kasihan, Bantul
 Kokap, Kulon Progo
 Kotagede, Yogyakarta
 Kraton, Yogyakarta
 Kretek, Bantul
 Lendah, Kulon Progo
 Mantrijeron, Yogyakarta
 Mergangsan, Yogyakarta
 Minggir, Sleman
 Mlati, Sleman
 Moyudan, Sleman
 Nanggulan, Kulon Progo
 Ngaglik, Sleman
 Ngampilan, Yogyakarta
 Ngawen, Gunung Kidul
 Ngemplak, Sleman
 Nglipar, Gunung Kidul
 Pajangan, Bantul
 Pakem, Sleman
 Pakualaman, Yogyakarta
 Paliyan, Gunung Kidul
 Pandak, Bantul
 Panggang, Gunung Kidul
 Panjatan, Kulon Progo
 Patuk, Gunung Kidul
 Pengasih, Kulon Progo
 Piyungan, Bantul
 Playen, Gunung Kidul
 Pleret, Bantul
 Ponjong, Gunung Kidul
 Prambanan, Sleman
 Pundong, Bantul
 Purwosari, Gunung Kidul
 Rongkop, Gunung Kidul
 Samigaluh, Kulon Progo
 Sanden, Bantul
 Saptosari, Gunung Kidul
 Sedayu, Bantul
 Semanu, Gunung Kidul
 Semin, Gunung Kidul
 Sentolo, Kulon Progo
 Sewon, Bantul
 Seyegan, Sleman
 Sleman, Sleman
 Srandakan, Bantul
 Tanjungsari, Gunung Kidul
 Tegalrejo, Yogyakarta
 Temon, Kulon Progo
 Tempel, Sleman
 Tepus, Gunung Kidul
 Turi, Sleman
 Umbulharjo, Yogyakarta
 Wates, Kulon Progo
 Wirobrajan, Yogyakarta
 Wonosari, Gunung Kidul

References

 
Yogyakarta (special region)